Renuka Nagarkoti (Nepali: रेनुका नगरकोटी) is a Nepali footballer who plays as a midfielder for APF Club and represents the Nepal women's national football team.

Career
At club level, Bhandari plays for APF Club.

International career
Renuka Nagarkoti represents Nepal at the international level. She is the Nepali national team captain

References

Living people
Nepal women's international footballers
Women's association football forwards
Year of birth missing (living people)
Nepalese women's footballers